The 1999 US Open mixed doubles was the mixed doubles event of the hundred-and-ninth edition of the US Open, the fourth and last Grand Slam of the year. Serena Williams and Max Mirnyi were the defending champions but did not compete that year.

Ai Sugiyama and Mahesh Bhupathi won in the final against unseeded Americans Kimberly Po and Donald Johnson, 6–4, 6–4.

Seeds

Draw

Final

Top half

Bottom half

References
1999 US Open – Doubles draws and results at the International Tennis Federation

Mixed Doubles
US Open (tennis) by year – Mixed doubles